Escobal is a corregimiento in Colón District, Colón Province, Panama with a population of 2,388 as of 2010. Its population as of 1990 was 1,964; its population as of 2000 was 2,181.  Escobal is situated on the shore of Lake Gatun.

References

Corregimientos of Colón Province
Populated places in Colón Province